North Bengkulu is a regency of Bengkulu Province, Indonesia, on the island of Sumatra. Following the splitting off of the southerly ten districts of Mukomuko Regency to form a separate North Bengkulu Regency, it now covers an area of 4,424.59 km2, and it had a population of 257,675 at the 2010 Census and 296,523 at the 2020 Census.

Administrative districts

At the 2010 Census the Regency was divided into twelve districts, but subsequently seven additional districts have been created by the splitting of existing ones. The nineteen districts are detailed below with their areas and populations at the 2010 Census and the 2020 Census. The table also includes the location of the district administrative centres, and the number of administrative villages (rural desa and urban kelurahan) in each district.

Notes: (a) Besides Enggano Island (Pulau Enggano) the district includes four smaller islands - Pulau Dua, Pulau Merbau, Pulau Bangkai and Pulau Satu. (b) the 2010 population of these new districts (established since 2010) are included in the figures for the districts from which they were split off. (c) includes offshore Mega Island (Pulau Mega).

References

External links 

Regencies of Bengkulu